Gonzalo Ávila Gordón (born 26 January 1998), known as Pipa, is a Spanish professional footballer who plays as a right-back for Bulgarian club Ludogorets Razgrad.

Career

Espanyol
Born in Esparraguera, Barcelona, Catalonia, Pipa finished his formation with RCD Espanyol, after previous stints at CF Damm and FS Esparraguera. He made his senior debut with the reserves on 20 February 2016, starting in a 0–1 Segunda División B away loss against Valencia CF Mestalla.

Pipa was a regular starter for the B-side during the 2016–17 season, which ended in relegation. On 22 May 2017 he renewed his contract until 2022, and scored his first senior goal on 27 August by netting the last in a 3–0 home win against FC Ascó in the Tercera División.

On 28 May 2018, Pipa was definitely promoted to the main squad in La Liga ahead of the 2018–19 campaign. The following 2 January, after failing to appear in a single match for the Pericos, he was loaned to Segunda División strugglers Gimnàstic de Tarragona until June.

Pipa made his professional debut on 6 January 2019, starting as a right winger in a 1–0 home win against Córdoba CF. He was a regular starter for the club during his six-month spell, suffering team relegation.

Upon returning to Espanyol, Pipa was handed the number 2 jersey, and made his first-team debut on 15 August 2019, starting in a 3–0 home defeat of FC Luzern in the UEFA Europa League. He made his top-tier debut on 26 September, replacing Wu Lei in a 1–1 away draw against RC Celta de Vigo.

Huddersfield Town
On 7 September 2020, Pipa signed a three-year contract with EFL Championship side Huddersfield Town, for an undisclosed fee. He scored his first goal for Huddersfield in a 3–0 win over Millwall on 31 October.

Career statistics

References

External links

1998 births
Living people
People from Esparreguera
Sportspeople from the Province of Barcelona
Spanish footballers
Footballers from Catalonia
Association football defenders
La Liga players
Segunda División players
Segunda División B players
Tercera División players
RCD Espanyol B footballers
RCD Espanyol footballers
Gimnàstic de Tarragona footballers
Huddersfield Town A.F.C. players
Olympiacos F.C. players
Spain youth international footballers
Spain under-21 international footballers
Spanish expatriate footballers
Spanish expatriate sportspeople in England
Expatriate footballers in England
English Football League players
Spanish expatriate sportspeople in Greece
Expatriate footballers in Greece
Super League Greece players